And a Whole Lotta You! is the second studio album by American rock and roll band Hi-Fives. The album was released on 1997 by Lookout!.

Track listing
 "It's Up to You" – 1:51
 "It Begin with You" – 1:32
 "I'm Gonna Sit Right Down and Cry Over You" – 1:31
 "Time Is Now" – 1:48
 "No-No" – 1:20
 "All I Want to Know" – 1:36
 "Words Of Love" – 2:02
 "Bad Connection" – 1:40
 "I'll Take You There" – 1:49
 "Say What You Want" – 1:31
 "You Can" – 2:23
 "Black and Blue" – 1:53
 "A Whole Lotta You" – 1:45
 "Peaquod" – 1:52
 "Shhh!" – 1:46
 "Tainted Love" – 1:36

Personnel
 Chris Imlay – Guitar and Vocals
 John Denery - Guitar and vocals
 Jess Hilliard - Bass guitar
 Denny Seelig - Drums

References

The Hi-Fives albums
1997 albums